Neil Laverne Frank (born September 11, 1931) is an American meteorologist and former director of the National Hurricane Center (NHC) in Florida.  He was instrumental in advancing both the scientific and informational aspects of hurricane forecasting.  He retired in 2008 as Chief Meteorologist at KHOU-TV in Houston.

Early history and family
Frank grew up in Wellington, Kansas, and attended nearby Southwestern College.  After receiving his bachelor's degree in chemistry in 1953 followed by military training in weather forecasting, he moved on to Florida State University, where he earned his Masters and Ph.D. degrees in meteorology. He served as a meteorologist in the Air Force at Homestead Air Force Base in Homestead, Florida as well.

Frank has been married over 60 years and has three children, 10 grandchildren, and five great-grandchildren.

NHC career
Prior to his graduate studies in meteorology, Frank served in the United States Air Force where he received training as a weather officer.  In 1961, he began working as a forecaster for the National Hurricane Center.  He was appointed director of the Center in 1974.  While director, Dr. Frank also served as chairman of the International Hurricane Committee, which coordinates hurricane warnings across North America.  He also participated in meteorological experiments conducted off the African coast. In 1987, he was called to testify as an expert witness before the United States Senate Committee on Commerce, Science and Transportation.   Frank is the longest serving director of the NHC.

As NHC director, Frank was in the news frequently when hurricanes threatened, appearing in numerous interviews with then-CBS news anchor Dan Rather, whose early career included coverage of several hurricanes.

During Hurricane Allen in 1980, Frank used an amateur radio station to communicate directly with the Brownsville Weather Center in Texas after it had lost all of its conventional communications links. The only remaining communications link between the Hurricane Center and Brownsville was the amateur radio station on battery power. NHC and Brownsville discussed the strange behavior of the eye of Hurricane Allen while it stalled just off the Texas Coast for almost 2 hours.

Broadcasting career
In June 1987, Frank retired from the National Hurricane Center and joined Houston's CBS affiliate, KHOU-TV.  He was already well known to the Houston public from his reports as Director of the National Hurricane Center, particularly those during Hurricane Alicia, which came ashore near Houston in 1983. Frank was the chief meteorologist for the television station for over 20 years and received numerous awards. In December 2007, Frank announced that he would retire from broadcasting at KHOU-TV the following year.  On Monday, May 19, 2008, Frank announced on the 10 PM news that he would retire at the end of May.  He would continue to provide the station with special weather projects and hurricane coverage.

Global Warming

Frank is a signatory to An Evangelical Declaration on Global Warming, which claims that "Earth and its ecosystems – created by God's intelligent design and infinite power and sustained by His faithful providence – are robust, resilient, self-regulating, and self-correcting."

Professional memberships and awards
Elected to council, American Meteorological Society, 1989-1992 term.
First place in the 1989 Texas Press Awards, Best weathercast.
2004 recipient of the Belo William H. Seay Award.

References

External links
 National Hurricane Center
 KHOU-TV, Houston

American meteorologists
Living people
People from Wellington, Kansas
Journalists from Houston
American television reporters and correspondents
Weather presenters
Florida State University alumni
1931 births
National Weather Service people